is a 2005 film by Masahiro Kobayashi. It premiered at the 2005 Cannes Film Festival where it was nominated for the Palme d'Or. Bashing went on to win special jury award at the Fajr Film Festival and won grand prize at Tokyo FILMeX.

Plot
Yuko Takai and a few other Japanese political activists in the Middle East were kidnapped and used as hostages. Upon returning to Japan, Yuko is mistreated for basically "making ripples in the water;" in other words, for not committing suicide and for making the Japanese look weak. This story is based on the real affairs of the kidnapping of three Japanese political activists by militia in Iraq in April 2004. Yuko Takai is a model of Nahoko Takato, a political activist, who was also harshly criticised by almost all Japanese.

Cast
 Fusako Urabe - Yuko Takai
 Nene Otsuka - Noriko Takai, Yuko's step mother
 Ryūzō Tanaka - Koji Takai, Yuko's father
 Takayuki Katō - Ex-boyfriend
 Kikujirō Honda - Father's boss
 Teruyuki Kagawa - Hotel manager

References

External links

2005 films
2000s Japanese-language films
2005 drama films
Films directed by Kobayashi Masahiro
Japanese films based on actual events
2000s Japanese films